Dassault Group (also GIM Dassault or Groupe Industriel Marcel Dassault SAS) is a French group of companies established in 1929 with the creation of Société des Avions Marcel Bloch (now Dassault Aviation) by Marcel Dassault, later led by his son Serge Dassault, and led since 2018 by co-founder of Dassault Systèmes Charles Edelstenne.

According to Challenges, the Dassault family's combined net worth is estimated at around 23.5 billion euros.

Subsidiaries 
Dassault Aviation
Dassault Falcon Jet
Dassault Falcon Service
Sogitec (simulation and integrated logistic support systems)
Dassault Systèmes (software and PLM development solutions)
Société de Véhicules Electriques (SVE), a joint venture between Dassault and Heuliez for the development of electric and plug-in electric hybrid vehicles (Cleanova II based on Renault Kangoo), its president and CEO is Gérard Thery. In 2010, Dow Kokam LLC acquires SVE, though Dassault Group still holds a minor share.
Groupe Figaro (media, including Le Figaro and L'Internaute)
Immobilière Dassault—an office and residential real estate firm focusing on properties in Paris, all revenues of which are generated in France 
Artcurial (auctions)
Arqana (thoroughbred auctions) (30%)
Château Dassault (wine)
Veolia
SABCA

References

External links
 

 
Conglomerate companies of France
Defence companies of France
Holding companies of France
Manufacturing companies of France
Manufacturing companies established in 1929
French companies established in 1929
Holding companies established in 1995
Conglomerate companies established in 1995
French companies established in 1995
Dassault family
Multinational companies headquartered in France
French brands
Marcel Dassault